Subsaximicrobium saxinquilinus is a bacterium from the genus of Subsaximicrobium.

References

Flavobacteria
Bacteria described in 2005